Ivan Velić (born 19 October 1972) is a Bosnian professional basketball coach and former player who is the head coach for Široki of the Championship of Bosnia and Herzegovina and ABA League Second Division.

Coaching career 
Velić spent most of his coaching career with Široki. He had two stints with Jolly Šibenik of the Croatian League, with whom, in the 2016–17 season, he finished in second place in the domestic cup, while the club also reached the play-offs of the national championship. 

On 21 June 2015, Velić was hired by Krka to be their head coach. In 2018, Velić worked with Sloboda Tuzla as head coach.

On 8 June 2018, Velić was appointed the head coach of Croatian club Cibona. In June 2019, he celebrated winning the national championship with the club. On 1 April 2020, Cibona confirmed temporary termination of the contract with Velić due to the coronavirus outbreak in Croatia. On 31 January 2021, Velić and Cibona parted ways. In July 2022, Široki named Velić as their new head coach.

National team coaching career
Velić served as the head coach in the past of both the Bosnia and Herzegovina national under-18 team, as well as the Croatia national under-20 team. 

He was also assistant coach of the senior men's Bosnia and Herzegovina national team under the head coach Duško Ivanović. In September 2017, Velić joined coaching staff of the Croatian national team. He left the Croatian staff in 2018.

References

External links 
 Coach Profile at Eurobasket.com

1972 births
Living people
Bosnia and Herzegovina basketball coaches
Bosnia and Herzegovina men's basketball players
Croatian basketball coaches
Croats of Bosnia and Herzegovina
HKK Široki players
OKK Sloboda Tuzla coaches
KK Cibona coaches
Sportspeople from Livno